Sychesia erubescens is a moth in the family Erebidae. It was described by Karl Jordan in 1916. It is found in Brazil.

References

Moths described in 1916
Phaegopterina